James Cutler Dunn Parker (June 2, 1828 – November 27, 1916) was an American organist, educator and composer.

Biography
James Cutler Dunn Parker was born in Boston on June 2, 1828, the son of Samuel Hale Parker. He graduated from Harvard in 1848. After graduating from Harvard Law School, Parker went to the Leipzig Conservatory in 1851, where he studied piano with Ignaz Moscheles and Louis Plaidy, composition with Julius Rietz and Ernst Richter, and music theory and harmony with Moritz Hauptmann.

He returned to Boston in 1854, and began offering private lessons, as he did throughout his life. In 1862, several of his private students formed the Parker Club, which offered concerts of instrumental and choral music. He married Maria Derby of Andover in 1859. They had one child. From 1864 to 1891, he served as organist at the Trinity Church, Boston, his career there coinciding almost completely with that of minister Phillips Brooks.  J.C.D. Parker's grandfather Samuel Parker had been rector at Trinity.

Parker also played the organ for the concerts of the Handel and Haydn Society.  He taught at the New England Conservatory from 1871 to 1897. After 1897 he worked as an examiner at the Conservatory.

Parker composed hymns, cantatas, oratorios, church music, and works for piano.  In addition, he wrote two sets of pedagogical pieces. He wrote works on harmony in 1855 and 1870, and translated Richter's Harmonielehre (Manual of Harmony) into English in 1873.

He died in Brookline, Massachusetts on November 27, 1916.

Notes

References
 (scroll down to entry for "Parker, James Cutler Dunn")

External links

1828 births
1916 deaths
19th-century classical composers
20th-century classical composers
American male classical composers
American Romantic composers
American classical organists
American male organists
American classical pianists
Male classical pianists
American male pianists
American music educators
Musicians from Boston
People from Brookline, Massachusetts
Harvard Law School alumni
19th-century classical pianists
19th-century American pianists
20th-century American composers
19th-century American composers
Classical musicians from Massachusetts
20th-century American male musicians
19th-century American male musicians
Male classical organists